Leftenan Adnan is a 2000 Malaysian Malay-language biographical war drama film directed by Aziz M. Osman and co-produced by both Grand Brilliance, Paradigmfilm, and the Malaysian Army. The film chronicles the actions of Adnan bin Saidi who had been involved as a Lieutenant of the Malay Regiment fending against the invasion of the Japanese army during the Second World War. A digitally-restored version of the film was released in 2020 as part of its 20th anniversary.

Plot 
Adnan bin Saidi, a handsome Malay from Sungai Ramal in Kajang, Selangor who had joined the Malay Regiment of the British Colonial Forces just before the Second World War broke out in Asia. By the time the war broke out, he had been promoted to the rank of Lieutenant, and was in command of Company C, 1st Battalion, Malay Regiment after the death of the British company commander, Captain H R Rix. His exploits and bravery in combat while leading his men against the Japanese Imperial Army became legendary. The two known engagements he was involved in are:
 The Battle of Pasir Panjang, and
 The Battle of Bukit Chandu or Opium Hill.

Both battles occurred during the final phase of the Japanese Imperial Army's assault on the city of Singapore during the Battle of Singapore. He later was executed after the battle.

Cast
 Hairie Othman as Lieutenant Adnan bin Saidi
 Umie Aida as Safiah, Adnan's wife
 Farid Amirul as Major Fujiwara
 Faizal Hussein as Private Ayob
 Rusdi Ramli as Private Malik
 Shaharuddin Thamby as Ibrahim Yaacob
 Wahid Senario as Ismail Malim Mas
 M. Osman as Pak Saidi, Adnan's father
 Sherie Merlis as Tumirah
 Rambo Chin as General Tomoyuki Yamashita
 TS Jeffry as Lai Teck
 Yank Kassim as Lim Bo Seng, Lai Teck's henchmen
 Zul Yahya as Ahmad bin Saidi
 Johan Abdullah as the Captain H R Rix
 Mejar Mohd Razak Omar as Sergeant Ngah
 Koperal Wan Shakri Wan Fe as Private Ali
 A Shepherd as The Doctor
 Williams Francis Hutchinson as Sir Smith

Historical accuracy
There are several historical liberties that were taken on the accounts of Adnan for dramatising purposes. The first point was Adnan's famously tragic death - in the film version, his death was not shown explicitly on film and discretely panned out to the closing credits, where it was implied that he and the surviving wounded in his company were tied to trees and bayoneted to death, which would be more correct version and in keeping with similar Japanese practice elsewhere.

This contrasts to the official version as recorded by Japanese Imperial Army, which indicated that he was executed first, then hung upside down from a cherry tree. British accounts have confirmed that his corpse was found hung upside down after the surrender and this has been repeated in a number of authoritative texts on the Malayan campaign. The actual mode of execution was never officially recorded.

In the film, General Tomoyuki Yamashita commented on the lieutenant's bravery and valour before Adnan's execution possibly as a lesson for the Japanese troops and said that if there were ten more soldiers like Adnan in the British Colonial Forces in Malaya at that time, he would have needed ten more divisions to conquer Malaya. However, the official version records that the execution by the Japanese troops in anger for his stubbornness in holding his position and inflicting large casualties on Japanese troops.

The Lewis gun that being used regularly by Hairi Othman in this film is actually a mocked up model. From standard general-purpose machine gun it attached with prop made circular bullet magazine. The actual lewis gun model is the magazine are in slim, thin and disk-shaped. Not bulky and big that being used in this film, which is similar to aircraft version of the magazine.

Criticism
The film received criticism for using Malay actors to portray Japanese and English soldiers throughout the film. Furthermore, the original English dialogue as spoken by the actors was voiced over by Malays speaking in halting and strongly accented English suggesting that there was an awkward attempt to alter the dialogue to give a different slant to the situations depicted and to portray the British in an unfavourable light.

Release and reception 
Leftenan Adnan was released on 31 August 2000 in conjunction with 43rd anniversary of Malaysia's indepencence and marketed as the "Ultimate Malay Film Epic".

Meor Shariman and Joe Lee, both writes for The Malay Mail dubbed the film as "the Malaysian version of Saving Private Ryan".

Legacy
In 2014, Leftenan Adnan was listed as one of 6 Best Merdeka Day-themed film by film portal, Cinema Online. It also listed by Astro Awani as one of 5 patriotic films based on true stories should watched. Malaysian teen magazine, Remaja also listed this film as among patriotic films should watched.

Explanatory notes

References

External links
 

2000 films
Malay-language films
Malaysian historical drama films
Pacific War films
Films set in the 1940s
Films directed by Aziz M. Osman
Films with screenplays by Aziz M. Osman
World War II films
World War II films based on actual events